Özgür Can Özcan (born 10 April 1988) is a Turkish professional footballer who plays as a forward for TFF Third League club Nevşehir Belediyespor.

Early career
Özcan was born in Antalya. He won a World fairplay award after informing the referee that he scored a goal with his hand in a match between Galatasaray and Denizlispor youth teams. The goal was cancelled and he was shown a yellow card.

Club career

Galatasaray
Özcan s trained by the Galatasaray youth department and was chosen for the professional team by Gheorghe Hagi in the 2004–05 season. He never appeared in any official match squad. He made his debut in a Turkish Cup match against Mersin İdman Yurdu, on 27 October 2005. He scored a goal in the same match.

Turkish legendary striker Hakan Şükür has said, "Özgürcan is a new product of Galatasaray football academy. He is my 'crown prince'(heir apparent)". This statement raised expectations from him by the media. He has many important features as a striker (i.e.) good at jumping, heading, stamina and composure despite his young age. "

Kayserispor
Özgürcan was lent out on loan to Kayserispor in the season of 2006–07.

Gaziantepspor
Once again he is loaned to Gaziantepspor for the season of 2007–08.

Sakaryaspor
Özgürcan was loaned out Sakaryaspor during the August 2009 transfer window. He started his loan scoring 17 goals in 31 league matches.

Çaykur Rizespor
He joined fellow TFF First League club Çaykur Rizespor on loan of the season.

Career statistics

Club

References

 5 OYUNCUYLA YOLLAR AYRILDI !, spor.haber3.com, 28 December 2015

External links

1988 births
Sportspeople from Antalya
Living people
Turkish footballers
Turkey youth international footballers
Turkey under-21 international footballers
Association football forwards
Galatasaray A2 footballers
Galatasaray S.K. footballers
Kayserispor footballers
Gaziantepspor footballers
Sakaryaspor footballers
Çaykur Rizespor footballers
Adanaspor footballers
Karşıyaka S.K. footballers
Denizlispor footballers
Akhisarspor footballers
TKİ Tavşanlı Linyitspor footballers
Adana Demirspor footballers
Boluspor footballers
Giresunspor footballers
Gaziantep F.K. footballers
Tuzlaspor players
Şanlıurfaspor footballers
Tarsus Idman Yurdu footballers
Süper Lig players
TFF First League players
TFF Second League players
TFF Third League players